The Belcea Quartet is a string quartet, formed in 1994, under the leadership of violinist Corina Belcea.

History
The quartet was formed while its members were studying at the Royal College of Music in London. Whilst there, they were coached by the Chilingirian Quartet. They subsequently studied with the Alban Berg Quartet at Cologne.

The quartet was one of the first groups to participate in the BBC Radio 3 New Generation Artists scheme, from 1999 to 2001.  They made their Carnegie Hall debut in 2000 as part of the 'Distinctive Debuts' series. Their first performance at the Edinburgh International Festival was in August 2001. The Belcea Quartet were quartet in-residence at Wigmore Hall in London from 2001 to 2006.  During their Wigmore residency, the quartet participated in the first performances of The Canticle of the Rose by Joseph Phibbs.

In the 2010/11 season, the Belcea Quartet gave the world premiere of Mark Anthony Turnage's new work for string quartet Twisted Blues with Twisted Ballad at Wigmore Hall, Cologne Philharmonie, Amsterdam Concertgebouw and the Vienna Konzerthaus.  In May 2011, they curated their own 'Beethoven & Schubert: Final Years’ project with concerts in Aldeburgh, the Gulbenkian Grand Auditorium and Philharmonie Luxembourg, collaborating with Imogen Cooper, Ian Bostridge, Mark Padmore, Julius Drake and Valentin Erben.  Towards the end of 2011, the Belcea Quartet embarked on an ambitious survey of the complete string quartets by Beethoven with cycles of concerts planned in the UK, Germany, Austria, Sweden and the USA.

The Belcea Quartet won the Gramophone Award for best debut recording in 2001.  Their discography for EMI includes Fauré's La Bonne Chanson with Ian Bostridge; Schubert's Trout Quintet with Thomas Adès and Corin Long; a double disc of Britten's string quartets, which won a MIDEM Cannes Award; Mozart's "Dissonance" and "Hoffmeister" quartets; and the complete Bartók quartets, for which the Quartet was awarded the title Chamber Music Ensemble of the Year by Germany's Echo Klassik Awards and nominated for a 2008 Gramophone Award. Their release of a double disc of the late Schubert Quartets and the String Quintet with Valentin Erben for EMI, was nominated for a Gramophone Award.

The Belcea Quartet are Quartet in Residence Guildhall School of Music and Drama, London, and, from the beginning of the 2010/11 season, Ensemble in Residence at the Vienna Konzerthaus.

Current members
Corina Belcea-Fisher, violin
Axel Schacher, violin, since 2010
Krzysztof Chorzelski, viola
Antoine Lederlin, cello, since 2006

Former members
Alasdair Tait, cello
Laura Samuel, violin
Matthew Talty, cello

Recordings
Partial list of recordings:
 Debussy, Dutilleux, Ravel – String Quartets, 2001
 Schubert – String Quartets, 2002
 Brahms – String Quartets, 2004
 Britten – String Quartets, 2005
 Schubert – Trout Quintet (with pianist Thomas Adès), 2005
 Mozart – String Quartets, 2006 (original line-up)
 Bartók – Complete String Quartets, 2008
 Schubert – String Quintet (with Valentin Erben), Quartet in G, Quartet in D minor, 2009
 Beethoven – Complete String Quartets, 2014

Notes

References
 EMI Liner Notes
 EMI Germany page

External links
 Official website
 Home Page at their management agency
 MUSO magazine interview

Selected concert reviews
 Tim Ashley, "Belcea/ Bostridge/ Adès".  The Guardian, 7 December 2001.
 Ivan Hewett, "Poise and personality".  Telegraph, 9 July 2002.
 Tom Service, "Bostridge/ Drake/ Belcea Quartet".  The Guardian, 19 August 2002.
 Geoffrey Norris, "Quest for the new".  Telegraph, 31 October 2002.
 Geoffrey Norris, "Profundity and vision".  Telegraph, 4 March 2003.
 David Fanning, "Aldeburgh Festival: precision of a madman".  Telegraph, 24 June 2003.
 Andrew Clements, "The Turn of the Screw".  The Guardian, 20 July 2004.
 Tom Service, "Belcea Quartet/Kildea".  The Guardian, 1 November 2004.
 Erica Jeal, "Janacek at 150".  The Guardian, 16 December 2004.
 Rian Evans, "An Evening in Buenos Aires" (review from Bath Festival).  The Guardian, 7 June 2005.
 George Hall, review of June 2005 Wigmore Hall concert.  The Guardian, 22 June 2005.
 Geoffrey Norris, "Four strings weave a taut web".  Telegraph, 5 June 2006.
 Geoffrey Norris, "Apt tribute to Britten's originality".  Telegraph, 5 December 2006.

Musical groups established in 1994
English string quartets
1994 establishments in England
BBC Radio 3 New Generation Artists